Jahanabad Lok Sabha constituency is one of the 40 Lok Sabha (parliamentary) constituencies in Bihar state in eastern India.Jahanabad constituency has a total of 12.7 lakh electorate out of which 2.3 lakh are Yadavs, 2.3 lakh are Bhumihar,1.5 lakh are chandrawanshi and EBC 1 lakh and 2.5 lakh Luv Kush (1 lakh kurmi + 1 lakh Koiri) voters.

Assembly segments
Jahanabad Lok Sabha constituency comprises the following Vidhan Sabha (legislative assembly) segments:

Members of Parliament

Election results

See also
 Arwal district
 Jehanabad district
 List of Constituencies of the Lok Sabha

References

External links
Jahanabad lok sabha  constituency election 2019 result details

Lok Sabha constituencies in Bihar
Politics of Arwal district
Politics of Jehanabad district
Politics of Gaya district